Wild, wild, wilds or wild may refer to:

Common meanings
 Wild animal
 Wilderness, a wild natural environment
 Wildness, the quality of being wild or untamed

Art, media and entertainment

Film and television
 Wild (2014 film), a 2014 American film from the 2012 book
 Wild (2016 film), a 2016 German film
 The Wild, a 2006 Disney 3D animation film
 Wild (TV series), a 2006 American documentary television series
 The Wilds (TV series), a 2020 fictional television series

Literature
 Wild: From Lost to Found on the Pacific Crest Trail a 2012 non-fiction book by Cheryl Strayed
 Wild, An elemental Journey, a 2006 autobiographical book by Jay Griffiths
 The Wild (novel), a 1991 novel by Whitley Strieber
 The Wild, a science fiction novel by David Zindell
 The Wilds, a 1998 limited-edition horror novel by Richard Laymon

Music
 Wild (band), a five-piece classical female group

Albums and EPs
 Wild (EP), 2015
 Wild, a 1999 album by Inkubus Sukkubus
 Wild, a 2016 album by Joanne Shaw Taylor
 Wild!, a 1989 album by Erasure
 Wild!!, a 2004 album by Terry Silverlight

 The Wild (Raekwon album), 2017
 The Wild (The Rural Alberta Advantage album), 2017

Songs and singles
 "Wild" (Jessie J song), 2013
 "Wild" (Namie Amuro song), 2009
 "Wild" (Troye Sivan song), 2015
 "Wild", a 2000 song by Poe on her album Haunted
 "Wild", a 2020 single by John Legend (feat. Gary Clark Jr.) from his album Bigger Love
 "The Wild", a song by Mumford & Sons from their 2018 album Delta

Concerts and tours
 The Wild Tour, 1995–1997 Red Hot Chili Peppers concert tour
 Walk In Lay Down (WILD), a biannual concert event at Washington University in St. Louis

Video games
 Wild (video game), a cancelled video game
 Rollercoaster Tycoon 3: Wild!, a video game expansion pack

Organizations
 Wild (company), a German company which produces natural ingredients for food products
 Wild Heerbrugg, a Swiss company that makes optical instruments
 The Wilds Christian Association, a Protestant Christian organization in South Carolina

Places
 Wild (river), a small stream in Germany and The Netherlands
 Wild Center,  a natural history center in Tupper Lake, New York
 Wild Lake, a lake near Idrija in western Slovenia
 The Wilds (Johannesburg), a municipal park in Johannesburg, South Africa
 The Wilds (Ohio), a wildlife conservation center in Muskingum County, Ohio

Radio stations
 WILD (AM), an AM station in the Boston radio market
 WILD-FM, the former callsign of an FM station in the Boston radio market, now WKAF
 WiLD 94.9 (KYLD), an FM station in San Francisco
 WLLD, a station in Tampa–St. Petersburg branded WiLD 94.1
 DXWT, popularly known as Wild FM, a radio station in the Philippines

Other uses
 Wild (surname), various people with the name
 Minnesota Wild, a National Hockey League team
 Wake Induced Lucid Dream, the move from a normal waking state into a dream state with no apparent lapse in consciousness
 Wheel Impact Load Detector, a type of railway defect detection device

See also
 
 
 Willd., a botanical author abbreviation
 Wield, a civil parish in Hampshire, England
 Feral child, a human child who has lived isolated from human contact from a very young age
 Wilde (disambiguation)
 Wyld (disambiguation)
 Weld (disambiguation)
 Wylde (disambiguation)